Hollywood Boulevard (1936) is a comedy film directed by Robert Florey and released by Paramount Pictures.

Plot
The film portrays, in a comic expose of gossip magazines of the time, has-been actor John Blakeford (Halliday) agreeing to write his memoirs for magazine publisher Jordan Winston (Gordon).

When Blakeford's daughter, Patricia (Hunt), asks him to desist for the sake of his ex-wife, Carlotta Blakeford (Marsh), he attempts to break his contract with Winston.

Cast

Production
The casting was announced in June 1936. Many former silent era actors had small roles.

Reception 
Frank Nugent of The New York Times was critical of the film: "It is, as you may judge, a pretty hoary melodrama and [a] slight enough excuse for a whole series of homilies upon the uncertainty of fame and fortune in the glamour city."

References

External links

1936 films
1930s English-language films
Films directed by Robert Florey
Paramount Pictures films
1936 comedy films
American black-and-white films
Films about actors
American comedy films
1930s American films